Fekir may refer to: 

 Nabil Fekir (born 1993), French professional footballer 
 Yassin Fekir (born 1997), French professional footballer

See also
 Fakir